Fred Frank Doelling (born September 27, 1938 in Valparaiso, Indiana) is a former American football safety in the National Football League for the Dallas Cowboys.  He played college football at the University of Pennsylvania.

Early years
Doelling attended Valparaiso High School. He accepted a football scholarship from the University of Pennsylvania.

He was a two-way player, who also played on special teams. Known for his speed, he was a starter and the leading team rusher in three consecutive seasons. As a sophomore, he recorded 97 carries for 511 yards and one touchdown. 

As a junior, he was limited with leg injuries, recording 78 carries for 340 rushing yards and 3 touchdowns.

As a senior, he tallied 133 carries for 707 yards (5.3-yard avg.) and 7 touchdowns. He registered 3 interceptions on defense, while helping lead his school to its first-ever Ivy League title. He ended his college eligibility with school records of 1,558 rushing yards on 305 carries for an average of 5 yards per carry. He played in the Chicago College All-Star Game.

In 2003, he was inducted into the Penn Athletics Hall of Fame.

Professional career
Doelling was signed as an undrafted free agent by the Dallas Cowboys after the 1960 NFL Draft in May. He was a part of the franchise's inaugural season and played in 2 games (2 starts) at safety. He was waived on November 7.

References

External links
University of Pennsylvania bio

1938 births
Living people
People from Valparaiso, Indiana
Players of American football from Indiana
American football safeties
Penn Quakers football players
Dallas Cowboys players